The Mid-Eastern Athletic Conference (MEAC) is a collegiate athletic conference whose full members are historically black colleges and universities (HBCUs) in the Southeastern and the Mid-Atlantic United States. It participates in the National Collegiate Athletic Association's (NCAA) Division I, and in football, in the Football Championship Subdivision (FCS).

Currently, the MEAC has automatic qualifying bids for NCAA postseason play in baseball (since 1994), men's basketball (since 1981), women's basketball (since 1982), softball (since 1995), men's and women's tennis (since 1998), and volleyball (since 1994). Bowling was officially sanctioned as a MEAC governed sport in 1999. Before that season, the MEAC was the first conference to secure NCAA sanctioning for women's bowling by adopting the club sport prior to the 1996–97 school year.

History

In 1969, a group whose members were long associated with interscholastic athletics met in Durham, North Carolina for the purpose of discussing the organization of a new conference. After the formulation of a committee, and their research reported, seven institutions, Delaware State University, Howard University, University of Maryland Eastern Shore, Morgan State University, North Carolina A&T State University, North Carolina Central University and South Carolina State College, agreed to become the Mid-Eastern Athletic Conference. South Carolina State had been a longtime member of the Southern Intercollegiate Athletic Conference, while the other charter members had been longtime members of the Central Intercollegiate Athletic Association.

The conference's main goals were to establish and supervise an intercollegiate athletic program among a group of educational institutions that shared the same academic standards and philosophy of co-curricular activities and seek status as a Division I conference for all of its sports.

The conference was confirmed in 1970, and had its first season of competition in football in 1971. To date, the MEAC has had three full-time commissioners. In 1978, the MEAC selected its first full-time commissioner, Kenneth A. Free, who served as commissioner until he resigned in 1995. He was succeeded by Charles S. Harris, who served at the position until 2002. On September 1, 2002, Dennis E. Thomas became the conference's commissioner. He retired on December 31, 2021. Sonja O. Stills became the first female commissioner of the MEAC on January 1, 2022. She is also the only female commissioner of a Division I HBCU athletic conference.

The MEAC experienced its first expansion in 1979 when Bethune–Cookman College (now Bethune–Cookman University) and Florida A&M University were admitted as new members. That same year, founding members Morgan State University, North Carolina Central University and University of Maryland Eastern Shore withdrew from the conference. All three schools eventually returned to the conference; Maryland Eastern Shore rejoined in 1981, Morgan State in 1984, and North Carolina Central in 2010.

On June 8, 1978, the MEAC was classified as a Division I conference by the NCAA. Prior to that year, the league operated as a Division II conference. The following month the MEAC received an automatic qualification to the NCAA Division I Men's Basketball Championship.

In 1984, membership in the MEAC again changed, as Florida A&M chose to leave. The university returned to the conference two years later. Coppin State College, now Coppin State University, joined the conference in 1985. The MEAC found some stability in membership with the addition of two HBCUs in Virginia, Hampton University and Norfolk State University in 1995 and 1997, respectively. For the next ten years, the MEAC remained an 11-member conference. In 2007, former CIAA member Winston-Salem State University was granted membership, but announced on September 11, 2009, that it would return to Division II at the end of 2009–10 and apply to return to the CIAA before ever becoming a full member of the MEAC.

North Carolina Central University rejoined the conference effective July 1, 2010. NCCU was one of seven founding member institutions of the MEAC, but withdrew from the conference in 1979, opting to remain a Division II member when the conference reclassified to Division I.

Savannah State University was announced as the newest member of the MEAC on March 10, 2010. Savannah State originally applied for membership into the MEAC in 2006 but faced an NCAA probationary period soon after. Membership was then deferred until the completion of the imposed probation period, which ended in May 2009. Savannah State then resubmitted their application for membership again in 2009 and was finally granted probationary membership status. On September 8, 2011, the university was confirmed as a full MEAC member.

While the MEAC has had no new full members since then, the conference added an associate member in 2014 when Augusta University, then known as Georgia Regents University, a Division II institution with Division I programs in men's and women's golf, joined for men's golf. Augusta became the MEAC's first associate member and first non-HBCU with any type of membership. The conference has since added two more non-HBCU associate members, with Monmouth University and the University of Alabama at Birmingham (UAB) joining for bowling in 2018.

In April 2017, Savannah State announced that it would drop to Division II effective with the 2019–20 school year. In November 2017, Hampton announced they would leave the MEAC to join the Big South Conference beginning with the 2018–19 season.

In February 2020 North Carolina A&T announced departing MEAC to join Big South Conference effective July 2021. Within few months, in June 2020, Florida A&M and Bethune-Cookman also announced that they will leave the MEAC and join the SWAC starting in July 2021.  As a result, the MEAC will have eight members remaining for 2021, with only six of its members sponsoring football. The MEAC has hired a consulting firm to help assess its current schools and to help it identify potential institutions for addition to the conference. The conference plans to operate with eight current members, starting 2021 until further expansion, in a compact geographical footprint removing North and South divisions.

In May 2021, multiple websites that report on HBCU sports indicated that the MEAC had reached out to two Division II HBCUs about their interest in transitioning to D-I and joining the MEAC. Kentucky State University and Virginia State University, respectively members of the Southern Intercollegiate Athletic Conference and Central Intercollegiate Athletic Association, confirmed that they had discussed possible membership with the MEAC and had commissioned feasibility studies on moving to Division I. Officials at both schools stated that they were considering the move, but would not commit to any change. One report also indicated that Chicago State University, a predominantly African-American school but not an HBCU, had lobbied the MEAC regarding membership. CSU is scheduled to leave the Western Athletic Conference, a league in which it is a major geographic outlier, in July 2022. According to this report, the MEAC had offered CSU associate membership in one sport, but was lukewarm to CSU becoming a full member because it does not sponsor football and is well outside the MEAC's geographic footprint.

In July 2022, the Northeast Conference (NEC) announced a partnership with the MEAC in which MEAC schools sponsoring baseball and men's and women's golf would become NEC affiliate members in their respective sports beginning in the 2022-23 season.

Member schools

Current members 

Notes

Associate members

Notes

Former full members

Notes

Former associate members

Membership timeline

Facilities 
All MEAC baseball schools currently compete as affiliate members of the Northeast Conference.

Apparel

Sports 

The Mid-Eastern Athletic Conference (MEAC) sponsors championship competition in six men's and eight women's NCAA-sanctioned sports.

Men's sponsored sports by school

Men's varsity sports not sponsored by the Mid-Eastern Athletic Conference which are played by MEAC schools:

Women's sponsored sports by school

Women's varsity sports not sponsored by the Mid-Eastern Athletic Conference which are played by MEAC schools:

Championships

NCAA National championships

Football 
The MEAC, along with the Southwestern Athletic Conference (SWAC), are the only two Division I conferences whose members are mostly Historically Black Colleges and Universities (HBCUs). In 2015, the MEAC joined the SWAC and Ivy leagues in abstaining from sending their conference champions to the FCS Playoffs. While the conference champion faces off in the Celebration Bowl against the SWAC Champion, the remaining conference members remain eligible for at-large bids for the playoffs.

This is a partial list of the last 10 champions. For the full history, see List of Mid-Eastern Athletic Conference football champions.

Celebration Bowl results

Men's basketball 

On June 8, 1980, the MEAC earned the classification as a Division I conference by the National Collegiate Athletic Association (NCAA). Since 1981, the MEAC has received a qualifying bid to NCAA post season play in the sport of basketball. In three cases, MEAC schools seeded 15th (Coppin State in 1997, Hampton in 2001, Norfolk State in 2012) defeated second-seeded teams South Carolina, Iowa State and Missouri, respectively, in the NCAA tournament.

Coppin State again made history, as it qualified for the tournament as the first 20-loss team to play in the NCAA Tournament.

Tournament performance by active schools

Women's basketball

Baseball
Last 10 years of champions.

See also
List of American collegiate athletic stadiums and arenas
List of black college football classics

References

External links
 

 
Sports in the Eastern United States
Sports in the Southern United States
Sports organizations established in 1970
Articles which contain graphical timelines
Sports and historically black universities and colleges in the United States
Organizations based in Norfolk, Virginia